Titanatemnus is a pseudoscorpion genus of the Atemnidae.

Species
Source: Pseudoscorpions of the World 2.0:
 Titanatemnus alluaudi Vachon, 1935
 Titanatemnus chappuisi Beier, 1935
 Titanatemnus congicus Beier, 1932
 Titanatemnus conradti (Tullgren, 1908)
 Titanatemnus coreophilus Beier, 1948
 Titanatemnus equester (With, 1905)
 Titanatemnus gigas Beier, 1932
 Titanatemnus kibwezianus Beier, 1932
 Titanatemnus monardi Vachon, 1935
 Titanatemnus natalensis Beier, 1932
 Titanatemnus orientalis Beier, 1932
 Titanatemnus palmquisti (Tullgren, 1907)
 Titanatemnus regneri Beier, 1932
 Titanatemnus saegeri Beier, 1972
 Titanatemnus serrulatus Beier, 1932
 Titanatemnus similis Beier, 1932
 Titanatemnus sjoestedti (Tullgren, 1901)
 Titanatemnus tanensis Mahnert, 1983
 Titanatemnus tessmanni Beier, 1932
 Titanatemnus thomeensis (Ellingsen, 1906)
 Titanatemnus ugandanus Beier, 1932

References

Atemnidae
Pseudoscorpion genera